Bernard Joseph Harrington (born September 6, 1933) is an American prelate of the Roman Catholic Church. He served as bishop of the Diocese of Winona in Minnesota from 1999 to 2009 and as an auxiliary bishop of the Archdiocese of Detroit in Michigan from 1993 to 1999.

Biography

Early life 
Bernard Harrington was born on September 6, 1933, in Detroit, Michigan, to John and Norah (née Cronin) Harrington; he has two brothers, John and Timothy, and one sister, Irene. His parents were immigrants from Bantry Bay, County Cork, in the Republic of Ireland.

Harrington studied at Sacred Heart Seminary in Detroit and St. John's Provincial Seminary in Plymouth, Michigan.  He graduated from the Catholic University of America with a Master of Education degree.

Priesthood 
On June 6, 1959, Harrington was ordained to the priesthood in the Cathedral of the Most Blessed Sacrament in Detroit for the Archdiocese of Detroit.

During his priestly ministry, Harrington served as archdiocesan assistant superintendent of schools and pastor of Holy Name Parish in Birmingham, Michigan. From 1977 to 1985, he was rector of Sacred Heart Seminary. He later became director of the Department of Formation and pastor of St. Rene Goupil Parish in Sterling Heights, Michigan, in 1984.

Auxiliary Bishop of Detroit 
On November 23, 1993, Pope John Paul II appointed Harrington as an auxiliary bishop of the Archdiocese of Detroit and titular bishop of Uzalis.  He was consecrated on January 6, 1994 by then Archbishop Adam Maida, with Bishops Dale Melczek and Walter Schoenherr serving as co-consecrators. Harrington chose as his episcopal motto: "Have life more abundantly" (John 10:10).

As auxiliary bishop, Harrington served as vicar of the Office of Pastoral Services for Parishes in the archdiocesan curia, episcopal liaison for the Pope John Paul II Cultural Center in Washington, D.C., and regional bishop for Macomb County, Michigan and St. Clair County, Michigan.

Bishop of Winona 
On November 4, 1998, John Paul II named Harrington as the seventh bishop of Winona. He was installed on January 6, 1999.

Within the United States Conference of Catholic Bishops (USCCB), Harrington chaired the Committee on Education and sat on the Ad Hoc Committee on Catholic Bishops and Catholic Politicians. He was also a member of the Priestly Life and Ministry Committee and its liaison to the Subcommittee for Lay Ministry.

On April 15, 2008, Harrington commented on the plans of Kathy Redig, a chaplain in the diocese, to undergo an unauthorized ordination.  Harrington said that Redig would, in effect, be "self-excommunicating" herself from the Catholic Church by this action.  In May 2009, Harrington criticized the University of Notre Dame for inviting President Barack Obama to it commencement ceremonies.  Harrington stated that Notre Dame:...is choosing to defy the bishops of the United States and turn its back on the Catholic community in its continual defense of the right-to-life. The university’s stance is similar to that of Catholic politicians who say that they are pro-life and then support legislation and vote for programs that foster abortion.

Retirement and legacy 

On October 15, 2008, Pope Benedict XVI named Bishop John M. Quinn as coadjutor bishop of Winona.   On May 7, 2009, Pope Benedict XVI accepted Harrington's resignation.

See also
 

 Catholic Church hierarchy
 Catholic Church in the United States
 Historical list of the Catholic bishops of the United States
 List of Catholic bishops of the United States
 Lists of patriarchs, archbishops, and bishops

References

External links
 
 Diocese of Winona
 USCCB Office of Media Relations

1933 births
Living people
Clergy from Detroit
People from Sterling Heights, Michigan
Sacred Heart Major Seminary alumni
Catholic University of America alumni
Roman Catholic bishops of Winona
20th-century Roman Catholic bishops in the United States
21st-century Roman Catholic bishops in the United States
American people of Irish descent
Roman Catholic Archdiocese of Detroit
Sacred Heart Major Seminary faculty
Religious leaders from Michigan
Catholics from Michigan